The 2018–19 ECHL season was the 31st season of the ECHL. The regular season was scheduled to run from October 12, 2018, to April 7, 2019, with the Kelly Cup playoffs to follow. Twenty-seven teams in 20 states and two Canadian provinces each play a 72-game schedule. The Kelly Cup was won by the Newfoundland Growlers in their inaugural season over the Toledo Walleye.

League business

League changes
After serving as league commissioner for 16 seasons, Brian McKenna, stepped down from the position following the 2017–18 season. He was replaced by Ryan Crelin, who had most recently been serving as the ECHL's chief operating officer.

Team changes 
The Colorado Eagles ownership left the ECHL, bought an expansion franchise and joined the American Hockey League as the affiliate of the Colorado Avalanche to bring the AHL up to 31 teams to match the size of the National Hockey League to continue the one-to-one NHL/AHL affiliations.
The Maine Mariners in Portland, Maine, were added after purchasing the franchise from the folded Alaska Aces. The Mariners were the fifth team to replace a recently relocated American Hockey League (AHL) team, in this case the Portland Pirates, since 2015.
The Newfoundland Growlers in St. John's, Newfoundland and Labrador, were added, replacing the recently relocated St. John's IceCaps and becoming the sixth ECHL team to replace an AHL team since 2015.
The Quad City Mallards ceased operations after the 2017–18 season. The Mallards were the first of the teams added in the 2014 merger with the Central Hockey League to cease operations.

Conference realignment 
As the new ECHL teams in Portland, Maine, and St. John's, Newfoundland and Labrador, were added to the North Division of the Eastern Conference, the Wheeling Nailers were moved to the Western Conference and Central Division. With the Colorado Eagles joining the American Hockey League, the Kansas City Mavericks moved back to the Mountain Division from the Central.

Affiliation changes

Annual Board of Governors meeting
The annual ECHL Board of Governors meeting was held at the New York-New York Hotel and Casino in Las Vegas, Nevada, from June 18 to 22, 2018.

All-star game
The 2019 CCM/ECHL All-Star Classic was held on January 21, 2019, at the Huntington Center in Toledo, Ohio. The All-Star Classic retained the four team, 3-on-3 player tournament style used the previous season, but featured two teams made from the Toledo Walleye (named Team Hooks and Team Fins) and one team for each conference's All-Star players. In the round-robin, the Western Conference and Team Fins each went 2–1, while the Eastern Conference and Team Hooks went 1–2. In the semifinal round, the Eastern Conference defeated the Western Conference 4–3 and Team Fins defeated the Team Hooks 3–1. The Eastern Conference All-Star team then defeated Team Fins 2–1 following a shootout. The Brampton Beast's David Pacan was named the tournament's Most Valuable Player.

The skills competition took place in between rounds of the tournament. The Toledo Walleye's Bryan Moore won the fastest skater event, the Walleye's A.J. Jenks won the hardest shot event, and the Brampton Beast's David Pacan won the accuracy shooting event.

Standings

Final standings:

Eastern Conference

Western Conference

 - clinched playoff spot,  - clinched regular season division title,  - Brabham Cup (regular season) champion

Postseason

Playoffs format
At the end of the regular season, the top four teams in each division qualifies for the 2019 Kelly Cup playoffs and be seeded one through four based on highest point total earned in the season. Then the first two rounds of the playoffs are held within the division with the first seed facing the fourth seed and the second seed facing the third. The division champions then play each other in a conference championship. The Kelly Cup finals pits the Eastern Conference champion against the Western Conference champion.  All four rounds are a best-of-seven format.

Bracket

Awards

All-ECHL teams
First Team
Michael Houser (G) – Cincinnati Cyclones
Eric Knodel (D) – Cincinnati Cyclones
Matt Petgrave (D) – Brampton Beast
Caleb Herbert (F) – Utah Grizzlies
Adam Pleskach (F) – Tulsa Oilers
Jesse Schultz (F) – Cincinnati Cyclones

Second Team
Tomas Sholl (G) – Idaho Steelheads
Matt Register (D) – Toledo Walleye
Derek Sheppard (D) – Florida Everblades
Joe Cox (F) – Florida Everblades
Chris McCarthy (F) – Reading Royals
Zach O'Brien (F) – Newfoundland Growlers

Rookie Team
Tomas Sholl (G) – Idaho Steelheads
Alex Breton (D) – Allen Americans
Derek Sheppard (D) – Florida Everblades
Chris Collins (F) – Kalamazoo Wings
Steven Iacobellis (F) – Wichita Thunder
Myles Powell (F) – Cincinnati Cyclones

See also 
2018 in sports
2019 in sports

References

External links
ECHL website

 
2018–19
3
3